John Parisella is an American horse trainer known for training the racehorses Fight Over and Simply Majestic. He last raced during 2016 and by year's end had 1,241 career wins.

Early life and career
Parisella was born in Brooklyn to an Italian Catholic family. Parisella started his career as an assistant to Tommy Gullo, a legendary betting trainer. His mentor was horse trainer John P. Campo. Later he became a full-fledge horse trainer training horses for his uncle Joe Scandore who managed horses for James Caan, Don Adams, Telly Savalas and Don Rickles.

Parisella pioneered the use of foreign horses, mostly from Canada and turning them into stakes winners. John also trained several stakes winners for owner Ted Sabarese in the 1980s.

Personal life
Parisella has been married twice:
In 1975, he married Bernadette Birk, the former wife of horse trainer Robert J. Frankel. Parisella and Frankel were originally friends as well as competitors. Parisella raised his step-daughter Bethenny Frankel (Birk's daughter with Frankel) as his own child from the time she was five years old. Bethenny went on to become a reality TV star and entrepreneur.
He was also married to Melissa Parisella, with whom he has a daughter, Gabrielle (b. 1989). They divorced and Melissa has since re-married twice: first to American football player Mike Keller, with whom she had two children, and later to Robert Coveney.

Parisella appeared twice on the Johnny Carson Show.

References

1944 births
Living people
American horse trainers
People from Brooklyn
American people of Italian descent